The second inauguration of Ali Bongo Ondimba for his second seven-year term as the third President of Gabon occurred on 27 September 2016 after the August 2016 presidential election. This was the second time Ali Bongo took the oath after he was first sworn into office on 16 October 2016.

The inauguration took place despite the violence and tension in the country after Bongo won the election on a thin margin of only 6000 votes. The opposition, led by Jean Ping, denounced the election results as fraudulent. The inauguration was kept low key to prevent any violence between the two parties.

Dignitaries in attendance

Government representatives

References 

Bongo Ondimba, Ali
History of Gabon